The Hay Festival of Literature & Arts, better known as the Hay Festival, is an annual literature festival held in Hay-on-Wye, Powys, Wales, for 10 days from May to June. Devised by Norman, Rhoda and Peter Florence in 1988, the festival was described by Bill Clinton in 2001 as "The Woodstock of the mind". Tony Benn said: "In my mind it's replaced Christmas".

It has become a prominent festival in British culture, and sessions at the festival have been recorded for television and radio programmes such as The Readers' and Writers' Roadshow and The One Show. All the BBC's national radio channels apart from Radio One have been involved in broadcasting from the festival, and Sky Arts showed highlights of the festival from 2010 until 2013, handing over the main coverage to the BBC for the 2014 event.

History

The festival was founded in 1988 by Peter Florence and his parents Rhoda and Norman. Hay-on-Wye was already well known for its many bookshops before the festival was launched. Richard Booth opened his first shop there in 1962, and by the 1970s Hay had gained the nickname "The Town of Books". From its inception, the festival was held at a variety of venues around Hay, including the local Primary School, until 2005 when it moved to a unified location just south of the town.

The Guardian was the main sponsor of the festival from 2002 to 2010, succeeding The Sunday Times. The Daily Telegraph and its associated brands in Telegraph Media Group had two terms as three-year sponsors, starting with the 2011 festival.  From 2017, the Tata Group and Baillie Gifford are among the principal sponsors, along with the BBC and many non-media companies such as the Arts Council of Wales and the British Council.

Cristina Fuentes La Roche has been the International Director at Hay Festival since 2005.

The festival has expanded over the years to include musical performances and film previews. A children's festival, "Hay Fever", runs alongside the main festival. It has also expanded internationally and sister festivals take place in Aarhus, Arequipa, Nairobi, Dhaka,  Zacatecas, the Maldives, Kerala at Thiruvananthapuram, Beirut, Belfast, Cartagena, the Alhambra Palace, Parc Prison in Bridgend and Segovia. In 2009 Hay Festival also took on the ailing Brecon Jazz Festival.  It is run by a not-for-profit company, and entrance is free to everyone.

The 2012 festival included writers Martin Amis, Jung Chang, Louis de Bernières, Mark Haddon, Mario Vargas Llosa, Hilary Mantel, Ian McEwan, Michael Morpurgo, Ben Okri, Ian Rankin, Salman Rushdie, Owen Sheers, Jeanette Winterson, comedians Bill Bailey, Rob Brydon, Julian Clary, Jack Dee, Tim Minchin, politicians Peter Hain and Boris Johnson, scientists John D. Barrow, Martin Rees, Simon Singh, and general speakers Harry Belafonte, William Dalrymple, Stephen Fry, A. C. Grayling, Germaine Greer, Michael Ignatieff, and David Starkey.

In 2020 the festival was held digitally online due to the COVID-19 pandemic.

In late July 2021, co-founder and director Peter Florence resigned following an independent investigation that upheld a complaint of bullying against him. Florence had been suspended in October 2020. He commented: "I consider that my role had become untenable due to the conduct of the board and its insistence on holding a disciplinary hearing in my absence whilst I was off sick after a breakdown."

Awards
The Hay Festival was one of 11 Welsh winners of The Queen's Awards for Enterprise for 2009. The 2009 festival included writers Carol Ann Duffy, David Simon, Stephen Fry, David Nicholls, Jenny Valentine and Melvyn Bragg, scientists Martin Rees and Sabine Bahn, economists Anthony Giddens, Nicholas Stern, Howard Davies and Danny Quah, comedians Dylan Moran, Dara Ó Briain and Sandi Toksvig, and general speakers David Frost, Desmond Tutu, Rowan Williams and Rhodri Morgan.

Abu Dhabi controversies
Some of the biggest NGOs and bestselling authors signed a letter condemning abuse of free speech in Abu Dhabi as the 2020 Hay Festival commenced in Abu Dhabi in February. Authors who signed the letter included the likes of Stephen Fry, Noam Chomsky, Jung Chang to Bernardine Evaristo and NGOs such as Amnesty International and PEN International, condemned the abuse of free speech in the United Arab Emirates, which led to the arrest and abuse of human rights advocate Ahmed Mansoor, who by the time of the festival was held in solitary confinement to serve a 10-year prison time.

The festival's chair, Caroline Michel stated on 18 October 2020 that the event would not return to Abu Dhabi, in support of a curator Caitlin McNamara's allegation of sexual assault against the tolerance minister of UAE, Sheikh Nahyan bin Mubarak Al Nahyan. McNamara claimed that she was assaulted by the minister when they met at a remote island villa in February 2019 concerning work. The Emirati Foreign Ministry declined to comment on personal matters. When reached out, Britain's Metropolitan Police confirmed receiving a report of alleged rape on July 3 by a woman. In November 2020, Caitlin McNamara vowed to fight on following the CPS October 2020 decision to not prosecute the UAE minister because the alleged attack had occurred outside its jurisdiction. McNamara said the decision sent a message to Sheikh Nahyan and others who commit similar crimes "that as long as they're of economic value to the UK, they can do whatever they want". In an interview with The Sunday Times McNamara said she felt "abandoned" by the Hay Festival, and in an interview on Channel 4 stated that "mistakes" had been made in the way the festival handled her reporting the sexual assault to them which were "very distressing".

Gallery

Hay Festival 2016

See also 

Book trade in the United Kingdom
Books in the United Kingdom

References

External links

 Hay Festival homepage

1988 establishments in Wales
Annual events in Wales
Cultural festivals in Wales
Festivals established in 1988
Festivals in Wales
Hay-on-Wye
Literary festivals in Wales